Brent Fikowski is a Canadian CrossFit athlete known for his six appearances at the CrossFit Games. He finished second behind Mat Fraser at the 2017 Crossfit Games, and third in 2021.

He serves as president of the Professional Fitness Athlete's Association.

Early life 
Brent Fikowski grew up in the city of Lethbridge, Alberta, Canada. He competed in various sports, most notably swimming and volleyball. He swam competitively from the age of 6 to 18. He studied at G.S. Lakie Middle School, and Lethbridge Collegiate Institute. In 2009, he earned a volleyball scholarship at Lethbridge College where he studied for a diploma in business administration, majoring in accounting. He played for Lethbridge College Kodiaks, and his volleyball coach introduced him to CrossFit, which he then incorporated into his training. He was in a singing duo and once opened for Dr. Hook when he was 20. In 2011, he moved to Griffith University in the Gold Coast, Queensland, Australia, to continue his education, and earned a Bachelor of Commerce degree in 2013. He started competing in CrossFit competitions while in Australia. He worked as a financial controller in British Columbia after completing his studies, but left the job in 2018 to concentrate on CrossFit.

Career 
Brent began CrossFit as a way to improve volleyball, but quickly became a fixture on the regionals stage. After competing in a few local competitions in Australia, Brent competed in his first open in 2013, finishing 130th worldwide and qualifying for the 2013 Australia Regional. He would compete again the 2014 and 2015 Open and Regionals, finishing 3rd and 7th respectively, just outside of the Games cut line both years.

2016 was a breakout year for Fikowski. Prior to the Open, Brent went to Wodaplalooza on a team of three, tying for first place with CrossFit Shrewsbury. After finishing 24th in the world in the Open, Brent would go on to win the West regional and place 4th in the 2016 CrossFit Games winning events 3, 8, 10 and 14 over the course of the week. To cap off the season, Brent competed on Team Canada at the CrossFit Invitational, earning a 4th-place finish alongside Michele Letendre, Carol-Ann Reason-Thibault, and Patrick Vellner.

In 2017, Brent would again win the West Regional and advance to the CrossFit Games. Brent would achieve his highest career Games finish with a 2nd place overall, including his first White Leader's Jersey, earned by winning the first event. He would also win the 8th event of the weekend.

Brent Fikowski would return to the CrossFit Games in 2018, again taking 1st in the West Regional, despite his worst ever finish in the CrossFit Open. He would just miss a podium spot, finishing 4th after losing out on the tie-breaker.

With a myriad of changes to the sport of CrossFit, Brent again did not live up to his earlier Open success, initially failing to qualify as either a Top 20 on the worldwide leaderboard or a national champion. He decided to compete in Shanghai at the Asia CrossFit Championship in April 2019, where he won handily, earning his spot to the 2019 CrossFit Games. He would then compete at the Granite Games, where he finished 2nd to Travis Mayer in a competition. At the 2019 CrossFit Games, Brent failed to finish higher than 13th in any event and was eliminated in 23rd place after the 5th event.

2020 was another year of major changes due to the COVID-19 pandemic. Brent drastically improved his Open standing, finishing 32nd worldwide. He chose to compete earlier in the season in 2020, taking first place at the Dubai CrossFit Championship and earning a CrossFit Games invite. With the Games being threatened by the pandemic, CrossFit decided to have an online qualifier with the 30 qualifiers. In Stage 1 of the 2020 CrossFit Games, Brent finished 15th overall and failed to earn a bid to Aromas.

On June 16, 2020, Fikowski incorporated the Professional Fitness Athlete’s Association with other members of the fitness community to give voice to competitive fitness athletes and serve their interests.

A new year and new ownership brought additional changes to the sport of Crossfit. Brent again improved his performance in the Opening, finishing 22nd worldwide and 14th in North America, earning a spot to a new online qualifying round, the Quarterfinals. He finished 14th in the Quarterfinals, securing his spot in the next round at one of four North American semifinal events. Due to travel restrictions, Brent was forced to compete in the Atlas Games, which had been moved to a four event virtual format. Despite being out of qualifying contention after Day 1, Fikowski secured two wins in the final two events to finish 5th and earn an invite to the 2021 Crossfit Games. Brent Fikowski earned the white leader's jersey by the end of Day 1. On Day 2, he had his best finish in Event 9 by winning the event. By the end of the competition, Brent was able to finish 3rd overall, returning to the podium for the first time since 2017.

Personal life
Fikowski married Claire in September 2017 in Bali.

CrossFit Games results

References

External links

Living people
1991 births
CrossFit athletes
Griffith University alumni
Sportspeople from Lethbridge